SS Cornelia P. Spencer (MC contract 911) was a Liberty ship built in the United States during World War II. She was named after Cornelia Phillips Spencer, an influential writer and journalist in North Carolina during the Reconstruction era.

The ship was laid down by North Carolina Shipbuilding Company in their Cape Fear River yard on March 29, 1943, and launched on April 24, 1943.  She was chartered to the A. L. Burbank & Company, Ltd by the War Shipping Administration.

Loss 
After the first struck, the Naval Armed Guard detachment forced U-188 to submerge with gunfire. A second torpedo struck the stationary vessel an hour later and it began sinking. After the crew had abandoned ship the third torpedo hit it. Some landed on the coast of Somalia.

References 

Liberty ships
Ships built in Wilmington, North Carolina
1943 ships